Warid Congo SA was a GSM based mobile operator in the Republic of the Congo before its acquisition by Indian telecom company Airtel. It launched commercial operations on March 14, 2008.

Warid Congo is a joint venture between Warid Telecom International and the government of the Congo. At present, Warid is the country's third largest cellular operator having a subscriber base of 1 million with a market share of 17.7%.

History
Warid Telecom International acquired a GSM based mobile license in January 2008 less than a week after the commercial launch of Warid Uganda. The company launched commercial service in 11 cities and towns in first phase.

Network
Warid Congo currently uses GSM based GPRS (2.5G) and Edge (2.75G) technologies.

National numbering plan
Warid uses the following numbering scheme:

+242 04 X1X2X3X4X5X6X7

Where, 242 is the ISD code for the Republic of Congo and is required when dialling outside the country, 04 is the national destination code for Warid allocated by Agence de Régulation des Postes et des Communications Electroniques, Brazzaville. The subscriber number along with national destination code constitute the national significant number and is nine digit long.

Products and services
Warid Congo offers pay-as-you-go plans. This prepaid service comes with 64K SIM card. Subscribes can call up any local, national, and international telephone numbers. Such plans include Warid basic prepaid offer, Warid Welcome, Baninga 
friends and family service, and Warid Xpress.

In addition to sending and receiving SMS service, voicemail, voice based messaging service SMS Koza, end call notification on call completion, IVR, and USSD recharge are included in the prepaid base Warid connection. Other value added services such as mobile internet and waiting tone under the brand of WaridNet and WaridMusik can also be availed.

Mobile banking
In February 2012, Warid Congo announced the launch of Warid Mobicash over its network. Mobicash service facilitates customers to have money transaction even more secure. Moreover, payments can be transferred through the mobile phones and this service is available on all models of mobile phones and carriers. This is simple service, easy to use and open to everyone with no complications to download software and no restrictions for registration.

References

External links
 

Telecommunications companies of the Republic of the Congo
Telecommunications-related introductions in 2008
Organisations based in Brazzaville
Warid Telecom